Cedar Valley is a valley in the Troodos Mountains of central Cyprus.  It lies on the southern slopes of Mount Tripylos.  The valley is mainly known as a site of the Cyprus cedar, Cedrus brevifolia.  The valley has been designated a Natura 2000 site.

References

External links 

Valleys of Cyprus
Natura 2000 in Cyprus